Huub is a given name. Notable people with the name include:

Huub Bals (1937–1988), the first director and creator of the International Film Festival Rotterdam (IFFR)
Huub Bertens (born 1960), Dutch bridge player from Tilburg, Netherlands
Huub Broers (born 1951), Belgian politician
Huub Duyn (born 1984), Dutch racing cyclist
Huub Huizenaar (1909–1985), Dutch boxer who competed in the 1924 Summer Olympics
Huub Kortekaas (born 1935), Dutch sculptor and philosopher
Huub Loeffen (born 1972), retired football striker from the Netherlands
Huub Oosterhuis (born 1933), Dutch theologian and poet
Huub Rothengatter (born 1954), former racing driver from the Netherlands
Huub Stapel (born 1954), Dutch actor
Huub Stevens (born 1953), Dutch football manager and former defender
Huub van Boeckel (born 1960), retired professional tennis player from the Netherlands
Huub Zilverberg (born 1939), Dutch professional road bicycle racer

Dutch masculine given names